Milton Harbor is the name of a bay located in the city of Rye on Long Island Sound, in Westchester County, New York. Historical names for the harbor include Apwonnah  and Mill Creek 

Milton Harbor’s tidal wetlands and marshlands are home to a variety of plants and animals, especially birds, which come to feed, breed and build nests.

References

External links
 USGS - Geographic Names Information System - Milton Harbor
 NY Hometown Locator - Milton Harbor
 Milton Harbor - map

Bays of New York (state)
Rye, New York
Bays of Westchester County, New York
Long Island Sound